Hopelessly Incapable of Standing in the Way is the debut CD/EP by Spain Colored Orange released in 2005. It preceded their first full-length album, Sneaky Like a Villain, on the label Shout it Out Loud Music.

Spain Colored Orange combines a variety of musical genres, including indie rock, indie pop, '70s rock, psychedelic rock, and jazz.

Track listing
 "Momentary Drama" - 5:09
 "Maybe It's True" - 6:54
 "Let It Go" - 4:02
 "Remember One Thing" - 4:02
 "Persistent Intermission" - 3:37
 "Will You Catch On" - 4:45
 "I Kid You Not" - 5:16

Personnel
Gilbert Alfaro - (vocals/piano/synth)
Eric Jackson - (trumpet/organ)
Randy Platt - (guitars)
Steve Burnett - (bass)
James Diederich - (drums)
Justin Peak - (keys/production)
Bill Matney - guest percussionist

Awards
2006 Houston Press Music Awards:
Album of the year

References

External links
[ Hopelessly Incapable...] at allmusic

2005 albums